Dharmapuri is a village in Parbhani taluka of Parbhani district of Maharashtra state in India.

Demography
According to the 2011 census of India, Dharmapuri had a population of 3301, of which 1854 were male and 1447 were female. The average sex ratio of the village was 780, which was lower than the Maharashtra state average of 929. The literacy rate was 75.53% compared to 82.3% for the state. Male literacy rate was 85% while female literacy rate was 62%.

Geography and Transport
Following table shows distance of Dharmapuri from some of major cities.

References

Villages in Parbhani district